Ellispontos is a former municipality in Kozani regional unit, West Macedonia, Greece. Since the 2011 local government reform it is part of the municipality Kozani, of which it is a municipal unit. The 2011 census recorded 5,834 residents in the municipal unit. The seat of the municipality was in Koilada. The municipal unit of Ellispontos covers an area of 337.992 km2.

References

Populated places in Kozani (regional unit)
Former municipalities in Western Macedonia